The 62 Division is a division of the Sri Lanka Army. Established on 10 October 2010, the division is currently based in Galkulama in the Northern Province. The division is a part of Security Forces Headquarters – Wanni and has three brigades and six battalions. Major General D H M A Wijesighe USP NDC psc has been commander of the division since 18 October 2016.

Organisation
The division is currently organised as follows:
 621 Brigade
 14th Battalion, Sri Lanka Light Infantry
 17th Battalion, Sri Lanka National Guard
 622 Brigade
 9th Battalion, Gajaba Regiment (based in Nelumwewa, Northern Province)
 27th Battalion, Gajaba Regiment (based in Pulmodai, Eastern Province)
 623 Brigade
 26th Battalion, Sri Lanka Sinha Regiment
 11th Battalion, Gemunu Watch

References

2010 establishments in Sri Lanka
Military units and formations established in 2010
Organisations based in Northern Province, Sri Lanka
Sri Lanka Army divisions